4Fun.tv is a free-to-air 24-hour Polish language music video channel launched on February 14, 2004.

History
On November 27, 2003, Nova Communications (later 4fun Media) signed a satellite transmission agreement with Canal+ Sp. z o.o. for the upcoming music channel. On February 14, 2004, 4fun.tv began broadcasting tests, and the licence for satellite broadcasting of the channel was granted to the broadcaster by Krajowa Rada Radiofonii i Telewizji on May 14, 2004. For some time in 2012, the videos broadcast on 4fun.tv and on the sister channel RBL.TV were broadcast on Puls 2.

The channel presents mainly music videos, music programs, interactive programs in Dolby Digital Plus audio transmission and compression standard. In 2013, 4Fun Media created a 4Fun App for its audiences - a second screen application that allows access to additional content, quizzes and live contact with audiences.

Since December 19, 2013, 4fun.tv has been broadcasting on local multiplexes as part of digital terrestrial television.

In 2016, the satellite operator Eutelsat awarded the station with an award in the category of the Best Musical Channel. 4fun.tv was the only award-winning Polish station in the Eutelsat TV Awards 2016 competition.

Controversies
In 2007, the Krajowa Rada Radiofonii i Telewizji expressed reservations about programmes which may depress and adversely affect the moral and mental development of young people broadcast during a protected period (6 a.m. - 2 p.m.) and without proper designation (programmes only for persons over 18 years of age). The station ignored the Broadcasting Council's warnings and therefore threatened to withdraw the licence of the station, and consequently close and end the channel broadcasting.

Logo

References

External links
 

Television channels and stations established in 2004
Television channels in Poland
Music television channels
Music organisations based in Poland